François Alexandre Pierre de Garsault was a French botanist, zoologist and painter.  de Garsault was born on 16 April 1691 in Aix-en-Provence, France and died 3 August 1778 in Paris, France.  de Garsault was a member of the French Academy of Sciences.

Abbreviation

References

1691 births
1778 deaths
18th-century French botanists
18th-century French zoologists
Members of the French Academy of Sciences
Pteridologists